Sterling Hyltin is an American ballet dancer. She is currently a principal dancer at the New York City Ballet.

Early life and training
Hyltin was born in Amarillo, Texas. She wanted to be an ice skater, and would train before school started. However, Hyltin's mother also enrolled her to ballet classes. When she was 12, she auditioned for School of American Ballet, but was rejected. She was ultimately accepted by SAB's summer program in 2000, and stayed in New York as a full-time student.

Career
Hyltin became an apprentice with New York City Ballet in 2002, and became a member of the corps de ballet the following year. She was named soloist in 2006 and principal dancer the following year. Her repertoire included classical roles such as Aurora in The Sleeping Beauty and the Sylph in La Sylphide, George Balanchine's works such as "Rubies" from Jewels, Western Symphony and Theme and Variations, and Jerome Robbins works including Afternoon of a Faun and The Four Seasons. She also originated a number of roles including Jean-Pierre Frohlich's Varied Trio (in four) and Justin Peck's Pulcinella Variations.

Hyltin was featured in documentary Ballet 422, which follows the creation of Peck’s Paz de la Jolla.

Hyltin received the Janice Levin Dancer Award in 2005-06, which was given to promising corps dancers of NYCB.

Hyltin was a teaching fellow at School of American Ballet between 2014 and 2016. She became a permanent faculty in 2016.

She defended Peter Martins, then Ballet Master in Chief of the New York City Ballet, when he was accused of physical and sexual abuse.

Selected repertoire

Afternoon of a Faun
Apollo
Ballo della Regina
The Concert
Concerto DSCH
Coppélia (Swanilda)
Dances at a Gathering
The Four Seasons (Spring, Winter)
Harlequinade (Lead Alouette)
"Rubies" from Jewels
A Midsummer Night's Dream (Divertissement, Hermia, Butterfly)
The Nutcracker
Serenade
The Sleeping Beauty (Aurora, Eloquence, White Cat, Princess Florine)
La Source
Swan Lake (Balanchine version) (Odette)
Swan Lake (Martins version) (Odette/Odile, Pas de Quatre, Pas de Trois)
La Sylphide (The Sylph [NYCB Premiere])

Symphony in C (Second and Third Movements)
La Valse
Western Symphony

Created roles
Robert Binet: The Blue of Distance
Kim Brandstrup: Jeux
Jean-Pierre Frohlich: Varied Trio (in four)
Douglas Lee: Lifecasting
Pontus Lidberg: The Shimmering Asphalt
Annabelle Lopez Ochoa: Unframed
Wayne McGregor: Outlier
Peter Martins: Bal de Couture, Romeo + Juliet (Juliet), The Red ViolinBenjamin Millepied: Neverwhere, PlainspokenAlexey Miroshnichenko: The Lady with The Little DogJustin Peck: Everywhere We Go, The Most Incredible Thing (The Princess), Paz de la Jolla, Pulcinella VariationsAlexei Ratmansky: OdessaChristopher Wheeldon: Rococo Variations''

Personal life
In 2019, Hyltin married Ryan Bailes, a research analyst at an investment management firm.

References

New York City Ballet principal dancers
American ballerinas
School of American Ballet alumni
Janice Levin Award dancers
People from Amarillo, Texas
School of American Ballet faculty
1985 births
Living people
Dancers from Texas
Prima ballerinas
21st-century American ballet dancers
21st-century American women